Alain Mosconi (born 9 September 1949) is a French former swimmer, Olympic medalist and world record holder. He competed at the 1968 and 1972 Summer Olympics in six freestyle, butterfly and medley relay events. In 1968 he won a bronze medal in the 400 m freestyle and finished in fifth place in the 200 m individual freestyle and 4 × 200 m freestyle relay. In 1972, his best achievement was seventh place in the 4 × 100 m freestyle relay.

He won two medals at the European Championships in 1966 and 1970. In 1967 he set world records in the 400 metres freestyle and 800 metres freestyle.

He was president of General Motors, SEAT and Fiat, in France.

See also
World record progression 400 metres freestyle
World record progression 800 metres freestyle

References

External links
 

1949 births
Living people
People from Puteaux
French male butterfly swimmers
French male freestyle swimmers
Olympic swimmers of France
Swimmers at the 1968 Summer Olympics
Swimmers at the 1972 Summer Olympics
World record setters in swimming
Olympic bronze medalists in swimming
European Aquatics Championships medalists in swimming
Medalists at the 1968 Summer Olympics
Olympic bronze medalists for France
Sportspeople from Hauts-de-Seine